These are the RPM magazine Dance number one hits of 1997.

Chart history

See also
1997 in Canadian music
List of RPM number-one dance singles chart (Canada)

References

1997 in Canadian music
Canada Dance
Dance 1997
RPM electronic dance music chart
RPM (magazine) charts